Antonio Paganin (born 18 June 1966) is an Italian former professional football player, who played as a defender. He is the brother of Massimo Paganin, who was also a football player.

Career
Paganin was born in Vicenza. He began his career with Bologna (1982–1984) in the lower divisions, later moving to Serie A club Sampdoria (1984–88), and winning two Coppa Italia trophies during his time with the club. He moved to Udinese for two seasons (1988–90), helping the team to earn Serie A promotion, before moving to Internazionale (1990–95), where he won the UEFA Cup twice, in 1991 and in 1994. He later played with Atalanta (1995–96), and Verona  (1996–97), where he concluded his Serie A career, before moving to Torri Quartesolo  (1997–99), and later ending his career with Montecchio Maggiore (1999–2003), in the lower divisions.

Honours
Inter
 UEFA Cup: 1990–91, 1993–94.

Sampdoria
 Coppa Italia: 1984–85, 1987–88.

References

1966 births
Living people
Sportspeople from Vicenza
Association football defenders
Italian footballers
Serie A players
Serie B players
Bologna F.C. 1909 players
U.C. Sampdoria players
Udinese Calcio players
Inter Milan players
Atalanta B.C. players
Hellas Verona F.C. players
UEFA Cup winning players
Footballers from Veneto